National parks in the Netherlands were defined in the 1960s as areas of at least 10 km² consisting of natural terrains, water and/or forests, with a special landscape and flora and fauna.

The first two national parks were founded in the 1930s by private organisations. The first official national park, Schiermonnikoog National Park, was not established until 1989. The most recent national park to have been established is the Nieuw Land National Park, which was established in 2018.

In 2011, the government decided to make the provinces responsible for the national parks.

As of 2021, there are 21 national parks.

National parks

Footnotes

External links

 National Parks in the Netherlands (in Dutch)

Netherlands
 
National parks
National parks